Reinventing Marvin  is a 2017 French drama film directed by Anne Fontaine. It screened in the Horizons section of the 74th Venice International Film Festival on 2 September 2017, and won the Queer Lion.

The film stars Finnegan Oldfield as Marvin, a gay actor in Paris who is struggling to write and perform a one-man theatrical show about his childhood. Isabelle Huppert appears playing herself.

Cast
 Finnegan Oldfield as Marvin Bijoux
 Jules Porier as Young Marvin
 Grégory Gadebois as Dany Bijoux
 Vincent Macaigne as Abel Pinto
 Catherine Salée as Odile Bijoux
 Catherine Mouchet as Madeleine Clément
 Charles Berling as Roland
 Isabelle Huppert as Herself
 India Hair as Vanessa

See also
 Isabelle Huppert on screen and stage

References

External links
 
  Reinventing Marvin at TF1 Studio

2017 films
2017 drama films
2010s French-language films
French drama films
French LGBT-related films
Gay-related films
Films directed by Anne Fontaine
LGBT-related drama films
2017 LGBT-related films
2010s French films